Battlestar Galactica is an American science fiction franchise. It may also refer to the following aspects of the franchise:

Spacecraft 
Battlestar Galactica (fictional spacecraft), the titular fictional ship

Original TV series (1978–1980)
Battlestar Galactica (1978 TV series), the original television series
Saga of a Star World, pilot episode released theatrically in 1978 as "Battlestar Galactica"
Galactica 1980, a short-lived spin-off series of the original 1978 series

Rebooted TV series (2003–2012) 
Battlestar Galactica (miniseries), the 2003 three-hour miniseries
Battlestar Galactica (2004 TV series), the regular series that followed the miniseries from 2004 to 2009
Battlestar Galactica (season 1), episodes of reimagined series
Battlestar Galactica (season 2), episodes of reimagined series
Battlestar Galactica (season 3), episodes of reimagined series
Battlestar Galactica (season 4), episodes of reimagined series
Battlestar Galactica: The Resistance, ten webisodes-long 2006 spin-off of the re-imagined series
Battlestar Galactica: Razor Flashbacks, seven webisodes-long 2007 prequel story of the re-imagined series
Battlestar Galactica: Razor, 2007 TV movie for the re-imagined series
Battlestar Galactica: The Face of the Enemy, ten webisode 2008–09 series of the re-imagined series, taking place between season 4.0 and season 4.5
Battlestar Galactica: The Plan, 2009 TV movie for the re-imagined series
Battlestar Galactica: Blood & Chrome, a 10 webisode-long 2012 prequel series set between the events of Caprica and Battlestar Galactica

Other uses
 Battlestar Galactica: The Second Coming, a 1999 science-fiction action film
Battlestar Galactica (2003 video game), a video game developed by Warthog Games
Battlestar Galactica (comics), several comic book adaptations
Battlestar Galactica Collectible Card Game, a card game created by WizKids based on the 2003 reimagining
Battlestar Galactica (board game), a board game created by FASA in 1984
Battlestar Galactica: The Board Game, a board game created by Fantasy Flight Games in 2008
Battlestar Galactica (roller coaster), a dueling roller coaster at Universal Studios Singapore
Battlestar Galactica Cylon Bubble Machine, a bubble toy created by Larami in 1978
Battlestar Galactica Role Playing Game, a tabletop role-playing game by Margaret Weis Productions in 2007
Battlestar Galactica Online, a 2011 video game developed by Bigpoint Games using the Unity gaming engine.

See also
Battlestar (disambiguation)